Cedar Point is a town in Carteret County, North Carolina, United States. The population was 1,297 in 2010.

Geography
Cedar Point is located at the western end of Carteret County at  (34.685574, -77.082371). It is bordered to the north by the town of Peletier and to the east by the town of Cape Carteret. To the south is Bogue Sound, crossed by the B. Cameron Langston Bridge to Emerald Isle, and to the west is the tidal White Oak River, crossed by North Carolina Highway 24 to the town of Swansboro in Onslow County.

Demographics

2020 census

As of the 2020 United States census, there were 1,764 people, 739 households, and 557 families residing in the town.

2000 census
As of the census of 2000, there were 929 people, 438 households, and 278 families residing in the town. The population density was 381.8 people per square mile (147.6/km2). There were 893 housing units at an average density of 367.0 per square mile (141.9/km2). The racial makeup of the town was 98.92% White, 0.32% African American, 0.11% Native American, 0.32% Asian, 0.11% Pacific Islander, and 0.22% from two or more races. Hispanic or Latino of any race were 0.86% of the population.

There were 438 households, out of which 21.0% had children under the age of 18 living with them, 52.3% were married couples living together, 5.9% had a female householder with no husband present, and 36.5% were non-families. 30.6% of all households were made up of individuals, and 15.8% had someone living alone who was 65 years of age or older. The average household size was 2.12 and the average family size was 2.61.

In the town, the population was spread out, with 17.7% under the age of 18, 5.8% from 18 to 24, 23.5% from 25 to 44, 30.8% from 45 to 64, and 22.3% who were 65 years of age or older. The median age was 47 years. For every 100 females, there were 98.9 males. For every 100 females age 18 and over, there were 95.2 males.

The median income for a household in the town was $40,655, and the median income for a family was $46,818. Males had a median income of $30,000 versus $30,104 for females. The per capita income for the town was $25,457. About 11.1% of families and 10.9% of the population were below the poverty line, including 13.0% of those under age 18 and 9.5% of those age 65 or over.

References

External links
 Town of Cedar Point official website

Towns in North Carolina
Towns in Carteret County, North Carolina